The 1897 Princeton Tigers football team represented Princeton University in the 1897 college football season. The team finished with a 10–1 record.  The Tigers won their first ten games by a combined score of 339 to 0, but then lost the last game of the season by a 6–0 score against Yale. Two Princeton players, halfback Addison Kelly and end Garrett Cochran, were consensus first-team honorees on the 1897 College Football All-America Team.

Schedule

References

Princeton
Princeton Tigers football seasons
Princeton Tigers football